The Serbian Hockey League Season for 1999-2000 was the ninth season of the league. Only three teams participated, as in the previous season. Once again, the teams from Belgrade were out because the arena in Belgrade was out. HK Vojvodina was the winner.

Teams
HK Vojvodina
HK Spartak Subotica
HK Novi Sad

Regular season standings

Playoffs
There were only the finals. HK Vojvodina beat HK Spartak.
Game 1 - HK Vojvodina vs HK Spartak 5-2
Game 2 - HK Vojvodina vs HK Spartak 6-7
Game 3 - HK Vojvodina vs HK Spartak 3-0

Serbian Hockey League
Serbian Hockey League seasons
Serb